PCL may refer to:

Aviation
FAP Captain David Abenzur Rengifo International Airport, near Pucallpa, Peru (IATA code: PCL)
Pilot-controlled lighting, a system by which aircraft pilots can control the lighting of runways and taxiways via radio control
 Pocket check list, a pilot's check list used by the U.S. Navy

Organizations
 Pacific Coast League, a Class Triple-A league in minor league baseball
 Pacific Coast Professional Football League, an American football league (1940–1948)
Workers' Communist Party (Italy), an Italian political party established in 2006
Portage County League, a high school sports league in northeastern Ohio, now called the Portage Trail Conference
 Philadelphia Catholic League, a Catholic high school sports league in Philadelphia and surrounding suburbs
 Philippine Councilors League, an organization in the Philippines with city and municipal councilors as members
 PCL Construction, a general contracting organization in Canada and the United States
 Physical Chemistry Laboratory, University of Oxford, England

Places
 Parkway Central Library, the main public library in Philadelphia, Pennsylvania
 Perry–Castañeda Library at The University of Texas at Austin
 Polytechnic of Central London, now the University of Westminster

Science and technology
 Passive Coherent Location, or passive radar, a radar system exploiting commercial broadcast signals
 Phosphorus pentachloride, PCl5, and Phosphorus trichloride, PCl3
 Plasma cell leukemia
 Polycaprolactone, a polyester
 Posterior cruciate ligament, a ligament of the knee
 Printer Command Language, Hewlett-Packard
 Psychopathy Checklist, Revised or Hare Psychopathy Checklist, a list of psychopathy diagnostic criteria
 Program Control Language of Presentation (software)
 Point Cloud Library of algorithms
 Proximal Centriole-Like
 Performance Counters for Linux, a Linux performance monitoring tool, now called perf
 PTSD Checklist, a screening test for post-traumatic stress disorder